El Chaco Canton is a canton of Ecuador, located in the Napo Province.  Its capital is the town of El Chaco.  Its population at the 2001 census was 6,133.

References

Cantons of Napo Province